Barrington Daniels Parker Jr. (born August 21, 1944) is a Senior United States circuit judge of the United States Court of Appeals for the Second Circuit.

Background 

Parker's father, Barrington Daniels Parker Sr., was a judge on the United States District Court for the District of Columbia, from 1969 to 1993. 

Parker studied at Yale University, where he received a Bachelor of Arts degree in 1965. He received a Juris Doctor from Yale Law School in 1969. He serves on the Yale Corporation, the university's board of trustees. He also was a member of St. Elmo, a secret society at Yale.

Career 

He served as law clerk for Judge Aubrey E. Robinson Jr. on the United States District Court for the District of Columbia from 1969 to 1970. Parker had been in private practice as an attorney in New York City for 24 years, from 1970 to 1994. He was also a partner at Parker Auspitz Neesemann & Delehanty and Morrison & Foerster and an associate at Sullivan and Cromwell.

Federal judicial service 
Parker was nominated to the United States District Court for the Southern District of New York on April 26, 1994, to a seat vacated by Leonard B. Sand, who assumed senior status on July 1, 1993. He was confirmed on 
September 14, 1994 by a voice vote. He received his commission on September 15, 1994. His service as a district judge was terminated on October 18, 2001 when he was elevated to the United States Court of Appeals for the Second Circuit.

Parker was initially nominated to that court by President George W. Bush on May 9, 2001, to fill a seat vacated by Judge Ralph K. Winter, who assumed senior status on September 30, 2000. However, the Democratic-controlled United States Senate returned Parker's nomination just a few months later without considering it. Bush renominated him, along with many other previously returned nominees, on September 4, 2001. This time, the Senate confirmed Parker's nomination a little over a month later, on October 11, 2001, by a 100–0 vote. He received his commission on October 16, 2001. He assumed senior status on October 10, 2009.

The fact that Parker had earlier been appointed to the United States District Court for the Southern District of New York by President Bill Clinton in 1994 may explain the speed with which the Senate confirmed Parker's promotion to the Second Circuit. It was somewhat unusual for Parker to be appointed to the federal bench by one President and then later promoted by a President from the opposing political party, although several other Second Circuit judges have had a similar trajectory, including Jon O. Newman,  Fred I. Parker, and Sonia Sotomayor.

On July 9, 2019, Parker was part of a three-judge panel which ruled that President Donald Trump cannot block people from his Twitter account for being critical of him. Writing for the panel, Parker said that the president uses his Twitter account to make official announcements and actions, so that responses to it are protected by the First Amendment. The decision affirmed an earlier ruling by U.S. District Judge Naomi Reice Buchwald.

Personal life 
Parker is the son of Barrington D. Parker.

See also 
 List of African-American federal judges
 List of African-American jurists

References

External links

1944 births
Living people
20th-century American judges
21st-century American judges
African-American judges
Judges of the United States Court of Appeals for the Second Circuit
Judges of the United States District Court for the Southern District of New York
People associated with Morrison & Foerster
People from Washington, D.C.
United States court of appeals judges appointed by George W. Bush
United States district court judges appointed by Bill Clinton
Yale Law School alumni